Nachada is a rural locality (a selo) and the administrative center of Nachadinsky Selsoviet, Tlyaratinsky District, Republic of Dagestan, Russia. The population was 162 as of 2010. There are 2 streets.

Geography 
Nachada is located 31 km northeast of Tlyarata (the district's administrative centre) by road. Tinchuda is the nearest rural locality.

References 

Rural localities in Tlyaratinsky District